Bidentatettix is an Asian genus of ground-hoppers (Orthoptera: Caelifera) in the subfamily Scelimeninae and the tribe Scelimenini.

Species 
Bidentatettix includes the two species:
Bidentatettix gorochovi (Podgornaya, 1992)
Bidentatettix yunnanensis Zheng, 1992 - type species

References

External links 
 

Tetrigidae
Caelifera genera
Orthoptera of Indo-China